Spire Peaks is a  mountain located in British Columbia, Canada.

Description
Spire Peaks is set within Garibaldi Provincial Park and is part of the Garibaldi Ranges of the Coast Mountains. The southwest summit has an elevation of 2,279 meters and the northeast peak is 2,245 meters, and they are separated 500 meters apart. Topographic relief is significant as the north aspect rises 1,280 meters (4,200 feet) in two kilometers (1.2 mile). Precipitation runoff and glacial meltwater from the north side of the peak drains to Pitt River, and the southern slope drains to Skookum Creek, thence Mamquam River.

History
The first ascent of the summit was made July 22, 1913, by Don Munday and Ben Hanafin. Don would write a poem about the climb, Spire Peak—First Ascent, and recall that the rocks "were as hot as a stove." The toponym was officially adopted March 9, 1979, by the Geographical Names Board of Canada.

Climate

Based on the Köppen climate classification, Spire Peaks is located in the marine west coast climate zone of western North America. Most weather fronts originate in the Pacific Ocean, and travel east toward the Coast Mountains where they are forced upward by the range (Orographic lift), causing them to drop their moisture in the form of rain or snowfall. As a result, the Coast Mountains experience high precipitation, especially during the winter months in the form of snowfall. Winter temperatures can drop below −20 °C with wind chill factors below −30 °C. This climate supports the Spire Glacier on the northeast slope.

See also
 
 Geography of British Columbia

Gallery

References

External links
 Spire Peaks: Weather forecast
 Spire Peak poem: google.com/books

Garibaldi Ranges
Two-thousanders of British Columbia
Sea-to-Sky Corridor
New Westminster Land District
Coast Mountains